Voila is the seventh studio album by the American singer Belinda Carlisle, released in 2007. It was Carlisle's first studio album in over a decade, and is a covers album of "classic French chansons and pop standards", much different from Carlisle's previous English language pop records.

The album was critically praised however did sell moderately. Although all of the songs are sung in French, many of the musicians featured on the album are Irish. The album features keyboard arrangements from Brian Eno.

Background
In an October 2006 press release describing the album, Carlisle said "After I moved to France, I became familiar with the classic French chansons and a lot of French pop music. I realized there was a whole world of artists and singers I was not familiar with. As I discovered all these amazing songs, I came to love this music and wanted to record some of them with a playful, contemporary feel."

Describing how music can transcend any language barrier Carlisle stated, "You don't really have to know what's being sung to know that 'Avec Les Temps' [sic] is a devastating love song.   When I heard that song the first time, it broke my heart."

Upon the album's initial release, a limited edition version was available with a bonus second CD featuring four additional tracks sung in English. Despite the favourable reviews, Allmusic wrote "... not just a rewarding detour but one of her best album", in the US, the album sold a modest 3,000 copies in its first two weeks.

Track listing

Personnel

References

2007 albums
Belinda Carlisle albums
Rykodisc albums
French-language albums
Albums produced by John Reynolds (musician)
Covers albums